Chile is a predominantly Christian country, with adherents of Islam being a minuscule minority. Due to secular nature of the Chile's constitution, Muslims are free to proselytize and build places of worship in the country.
The statistics for Islam in Chile estimate a total Muslim population of approximately 5000, representing less than 0.02% of the population. There are a number of Islamic organizations in Chile, including the "Muslim Society of Chile and As-Salam Mosque" in Santiago, Chile, "Bilal Mosque"(Mezquita Bilal) in Iquique, and the "Mohammed VI Cultural Center" (Centro Cultural Mohammed VI) in Coquimbo, the Community Islam Sunni Chile (Comunidad Islam Sunni Chile) and the Ahmadiyya Muslim Community Chile, which was established in 2011,

History

According to Chronicles of the History of Chile by Aurelio Díaz Meza, there was a man in the expedition of discoverer Diego de Almagro, called Pedro de Gasco who was a morisco, or Muslim from Spain who was forced to convert from Islam to Catholicism. The coming of moriscos was covered by history but, recently scholars of Chilean history have started acknowledging the country's Moorish heritage and its effects on the development of Chilean culture and identity.

It is known that in 1854 two “Turks” resided in the country, a situation that was repeated in the censuses of 1865 and 1875. Their country of origin is not known, just that they were natives of some territory of the immense Ottoman Empire, and this was followed two years later by the first major wave of Muslims to Chile began in 1856, with the arrival of Arab immigrants from the Ottoman Empire territories consisting of today's Syria, Lebanon and Palestine.

According to the 1885 census, the number of “Turks” had risen to 29, but there is no precise information on their origin and their faith, since religion was not included in that census. However, the census of 1895 registered the presence of 76 “Turks”, 58 of them Muslims, who were primarily concentrated in the north of Chile in Tarapacá, Atacama, Valparaiso, and Santiago. In the census of 1907, the Muslim population was reported to have increased to 1,498 people, all of them foreigners. They were 1,183 men and 315 women, representing only 0.04 percent of the population, although this was recorded as the highest percentage of Muslims in Chile's history. In 1920 a new census showed that the number of Muslims had decreased to 402, with 343 men and 59 women. The greatest numbers were in Santiago and Antofagasta, with 76 in each province. The latest census figures from 2002 found a total of 2,894 Muslims living in Chile (0.03% of the population over 15), 66% of whom were men. The previous census of 1992 did not include Islam as an alternative.

In Santiago, the first Islamic institution of Chile, the Society of Muslim Union of Chile (Sociedad Unión Musulmana), was founded on 25 September 1926. Later, on 16 October 1927, the Society of Mutual Aids and Islamic Charity was established. With the 1952 census, the number of Muslims had risen again to 956. The majority lived in Santiago, with the rest of the population scattered in the provinces of Antofagasta, Coquimbo, Valparaíso, O'Higgins, Concepción, Malleco, Cautín and Valdivia, without much organization among them. Their numbers decreased again, so that by 1960 there were only 522, with the majority of 209 living in Santiago. A decade later, the number of Muslims had increased to 1,431. However, the census did not indicate whether they were men or women, nationals or foreigners. Nevertheless, they were spread throughout the country.

In 1988, the construction of the mosque of Santiago named Mezquita As-Salam was initiated by Sheikh Taufiq Rumie', who had led the Muslim community for more than sixty years. The mosque was finished in 1989 and was inaugurated by a prince of Malaysia in 1996, and it was reported that by end of the 1980s, some indigenous Chileans had also converted to Islam, with numbers increasing after the completion of the mosque. Muslim Chilean population was increased by the presence of foreign trade and investment from Muslim countries. Many Malaysian businessmen and their families settled Chile after the inauguration of the mosque by a Malaysian prince. Due to the external interference, and especially to the strengthening of Shia Islam by part of the Iranian help in 1996, they inaugurated Centro de Cultura Islámica, in Las Condes, Santiago, where they consolidated a Shi'ite Muslim community who mostly arrived in Chile in the 19th century. Most Shi'ite Muslim Chileans are of Iranian blood, they may still speak Persian and/or other Iranian language, aside from Arabic and Spanish. In 1997, Pakistani retailers purchased land for the construction of the Bilal Mosque and madrasa in Iquique, which was completed in 1999. Following the death of Sheikh Taufiq Rumie' in 1998, Usama Abu Gazaleh was elected Imam of the mosque following the passing of Taufiq Rumie'.

Infrastructure

Through the 1970s and 1980s, there were no religious leaders or centers for praying. Muslims who maintained the faith met in the residence of Taufik Rumie’ Dalu, a trader of Syrian origin. In 1990 the construction of the Al-Salam Mosque began, the first in the country. In 1995 another mosque was inaugurated in Temuco, and 1998 a new one in Iquique. Sources of the Islamic community indicate that at the moment, in Chile, there are 3,000 Muslims. Many of those are Chileans who, as a result of their conversion, have even changed their names. In spite of the small number of believers, they are not a homogenous community. The majority are Sunni, and the rest are Shiites, Sufi groups have also arisen.

Today
There are a number of organizations founded by the Muslim community in Chile, including:
Asociación Islámica de Chile (Islamic Association of Chile)
Centro de Cultura y Beneficencia Islámico
Centro Chileno Islámico de Cultura de Puerto Montt

See also 
Latin American Muslims
Islamic Organization of Latin America
Latino Muslims
Arab Chilean

References

External links
Centro Islámico de Cultura/ Islamic Centre of Culture (Centro Islámico de Cultura)
The Muslim Community in Chile: Origins and Dreams
Comunidad Islam Sunni Chile (Community Islam Sunni Chile)
Halal Certification Center Of Chile Chilehalal (Halal Certification)
[http://www.halalexpochile.cl  2nd Conference on Halal  Food & Control Chile 2013 HalalExpoChile 2013

 
Chile
Chile